Vetto is a comune (municipality) in the Province of Reggio Emilia in the Italian region Emilia-Romagna, located about  west of Bologna and about  southwest of Reggio Emilia.   

Vetto borders the following municipalities: Castelnovo ne' Monti, Canossa, Neviano degli Arduini, Palanzano, Ventasso.

References

Cities and towns in Emilia-Romagna